April Parker Jones is an American television actress, best known for her roles as Darcy Hawkins in the CBS post-apocalyptic drama series Jericho from 2006 to 2008, and as Natalie Henning in the Oprah Winfrey Network prime time soap opera, If Loving You Is Wrong (2014–2020). In 2018, she starred in the CW superhero series, Supergirl as Colonel Lauren Haley.

Life and career
Parker was born in Durham, North Carolina and attended North Carolina Central University before moving to New York. After guest-starring role on  CSI: Miami, in 2006 she won the series regular role of Darcy Hawkins in the CBS series Jericho. The series was canceled after two seasons and Parker Jones later appeared on Lost, The Unit, NCIS, Scandal, and had recurring roles in 90210 and The Fosters.

In 2014, Parker Jones was cast as one of leads in the Oprah Winfrey Network prime time soap opera, If Loving You Is Wrong. She plays the role of Natalie Henning, the single working mother. The series also stars Edwina Findley, Zulay Henao, Heather Hemmens, and Amanda Clayton. In 2015, she also had the recurring role as detective Claire Bryce in the ShondaLand's legal thriller How to Get Away with Murder, and the following year on Lifetime comedy-drama, Devious Maids.

In 2018, Parker starred as Gen. Anita DuFine in the final season of TNT drama series, The Last Ship, and later was cast in a series regular role as Lauren Haley in the fourth season of The CW superhero series, Supergirl. In 2022, Parker was cast in a recurring role on the Peacock drama series, Bel-Air, and co-starred opposite Joey King in the romantic drama film The In Between. Later she was cast as title character's mother in the CW series, Tom Swift.

Personal life
In June 2007, Parker married fellow actor Joseph J. Jones; they have two children together. Their son, Will, died in 2018.

Filmography

Film

Television

References

External links

American television actresses
American soap opera actresses
Living people
People from Durham, North Carolina
North Carolina Central University alumni
21st-century American actresses
Year of birth missing (living people)